Nellie Carrington (27 August 1916 – 7 October 1998) was a British athlete. She competed in the women's high jump at the 1936 Summer Olympics.

References

1916 births
1998 deaths
Athletes (track and field) at the 1936 Summer Olympics
British female high jumpers
Olympic athletes of Great Britain
Place of birth missing